Sir John Leighton (born 22 February 1959) is a British art historian, curator and museum director. He is currently Director-General of the National Galleries of Scotland.

Early life 
Leighton was born in Belfast in 1959 and educated at Portora Royal School Enniskillen (1970 – 77). He studied Fine Art at the University of Edinburgh and Edinburgh College of Art, graduating in 1982. He undertook postgraduate studies at the Courtauld Institute of Art in London, obtaining an MA in 1983.

Career 
Leighton was Curator of 19th-century paintings at the National Gallery in London from 1986 until 1997. He was responsible for numerous exhibitions during this period including Caspar David Friedrich’s Winter Landscapes (1990), Art in the Making: Impressionism (1990), Seurat’s Bathers (1997). He was Director of the Van Gogh Museum in Amsterdam from 1997 until 2006. Leighton has been Director-General of the National Galleries of Scotland since 2006. He was elected a Fellow of the Royal Society of Edinburgh in 2008.

In recognition of his contribution to the arts, he was appointed Chevalier of the Ordre des Arts et des Lettres in 2005, awarded an honorary degree from the University of Edinburgh in 2009  and a knighthood in December 2012. Leighton is a board member of the De Pont Museum of Contemporary Art in Tilburg; chair of the Council of Specialists of the Hermitage Amsterdam and a member of the supervisory board of the Rijksmuseum in Amsterdam.

John Leighton has written several books and articles, including: 
100 Masterpieces, National Galleries of Scotland, Edinburgh, 2015 
Manet and the Sea, with Gloria Groom et al. (Art Institute of Chicago, Philadelphia Museum of Art, Van Gogh Museum, 2003 –2004).
The Van Gogh Museum: A portrait, Van Gogh Museum, Amsterdam 2003
Signac 1863 -1935  with Marina Ferretti-Bocquillon et al. (Grand Palais, Paris,  Van Gogh Museum, Amsterdam, Metropolitan Museum of Art, New York, 2001).
Seurat's Bathers with Richard Thomson (National Gallery, London, 1997)
Art in the Making:  Impressionism  with David Bomford et al.(National Gallery, London, 1990)
Caspar David Friedrich 'Winter Landscape’ with Colin J. Bailey (National Gallery, London, 1989)
French Paintings from the USSR with Alastair Smith et al. (National Gallery, London, 1988)

Personal life 
Leighton is married to Gill Keay; they have one daughter and one son.

References 

1959 births
Living people
British art historians
British curators
Alumni of the Edinburgh College of Art
Alumni of the University of Edinburgh
People from Belfast
People educated at Portora Royal School
People associated with the National Gallery, London
Chevaliers of the Ordre des Arts et des Lettres